Quercus hintoniorum is a species of oak. It has only been found in the northeastern Mexican states of Coahuila and Nuevo León.

References

External links
photo of herbarium specimen collected in Coahuila in 1991

hintonorum
Endemic oaks of Mexico
Vulnerable plants
Flora of the Sierra Madre Oriental
Plants described in 1993
Taxonomy articles created by Polbot